Adam Keefe may refer to:

Adam Keefe (basketball) (born 1970), American basketball player 
Adam Keefe (ice hockey) (born 1984), Canadian ice hockey player

See also
Adam Keefe Horovitz or Ad-Rock (born 1966), American hip-hop singer with Beastie Boys